Mario Clemente Mastella (born 5 February 1947) is an Italian politician who has served as the mayor of Benevento since 20 June 2016. He is the leader of Union of Democrats for Europe, a minor centrist Italian party. He was Minister of Labour in the Berlusconi government from 10 May 1994 to 17 January 1995 and Minister of Justice in the Prodi government from 17 May 2006 to 17 January 2008.

He was also elected to the European Parliament in June 2009 on the list of The People of Freedom of Berlusconi.

Political career
Mastella was born in Ceppaloni, in the province of Benevento. In 1976 he was elected to the Chamber of Deputies as a member of the Christian Democracy party. After the party's dissolution in 1994, Mastella joined with Pierferdinando Casini to found a new party, called Centro Cristiano Democratico. That same year, following the election victory of Silvio Berlusconi, he was appointed Minister of Labour.

In 1998, after the fall of Romano Prodi's first government, Mastella decided to follow Francesco Cossiga, lifetime senator and former Italian Republic President. He left his party to found the Christian Democrats for the Republic, then Democratic Union for the Republic. This new political party, which supported the new centre-left government led by Massimo D'Alema, lasted only one year. In 1999, Mastella took over the leadership of UDEUR.

In 2005, Mastella took part in the primary election for the leadership of The Union. He obtained 4.6% of the vote.

Clemente Mastella and the President of the Sicilian Region Salvatore Cuffaro were subjects of a scandal when it was revealed that they had been the best men of Francesco Campanella, a former member of the Mafia who helped the boss Bernardo Provenzano when he was a fugitive from the law. In July 2000, Mastella was a witness at Campanella's wedding.

In 2016 he became mayor of the city of Benevento.

Minister of Justice
In 2006, Mastella became minister of Justice in the Prodi government. Mastella promoted a general amnesty in 2006. He also proposed criminalising Holocaust denial, but he dropped the proposal after opposition by historians and concerns about such law being unconstitutional.

As Minister of Justice, Mastella received an "Advice of Judicial Proceedings" in February 2007 from the Naples prosecutors’ office. He is being investigated for fraudulent bankruptcy when the Naples football club S.S.C. Napoli collapsed in 2004. Mastella was vice president of the Board of Directors.

In September 2007 he has asked the Higher Council of the Magistracy to arrange the transfer of the prosecuting attorney of Catanzaro Luigi De Magistris, who was inquiring on a committee of illegal transactions composed by politicians (including Mastella himself) and magistrates.

In May 2007, Mastella started a blog of his own (clementemastella.blogspot.com) in retaliation to criticism by the Italian comedian and political activist Beppe Grillo.

Mastella's wife, Sandra Lonardo, is also a UDEUR politician, and she acts as president of the Regional Council of Campania. She has been under house arrest for suspected bribery since 16 January 2008. Meanwhile, Clemente Mastella resigned from his position as Justice Minister; in announcing his resignation, he said that "between the love of my family and power I choose the former" and expressed his desire to be "more free from a political and personal point of view". Prodi rejected the resignation, but on 17 January Mastella said again that he was resigning. Prodi was to temporarily take over his portfolio. In 2017 Mastella was cleared of charges.

2008 Italian political crisis
Despite having earlier said that he would support Prodi's government without participating in it, on 21 January 2008, Mastella said that his party was ending its support, thereby depriving the government of its narrow majority in the Senate. Mastella said that UDEUR wanted an early election and that it would vote against the government if there was a vote of confidence.

Mastella's decision occurred a few days after a decision by the Constitutional Court which confirmed that there would be a referendum to modify the electoral system. As stated many times by Mastella, if the referendum was confirmed this would lead directly to the fall of the government and in fact this is what happened.

The fall of the government disrupted a pending election-law referendum that, if it had been passed, would have made it harder for small parties like Mastella's to gain seats in parliament.

On 6 February 2008, Mastella announced that he would be part of Silvio Berlusconi's Casa delle Libertà. but on 1 March Berlusconi refused to form a coalition with Mastella, citing too many differences in their political programmes.

After failing to secure a coalition with any other political party, Mastella decided to quit the electoral competition on 7 March, as the Italian electoral system subjects political parties not a part of a coalition to thresholds of 4% and 8% for the Chamber and the Senate, respectively.

European Parliament
He was elected to the European Parliament in June 2009 on the list of Berlusconi's The People of Freedom party. In July 2009 he was quoted in the Italian because of statements made about the per diem collected at the European Parliament: "An allowance of 290 euro!" - he said in a lift to his assistants - "'It's misery. ... They do not know what you get in the Italian Parliament". In the first months of the current legislature (2009-2014) of the European Parliament he was one of the MEPs less present during voting in plenary meetings.

Mayor of Benevento
On 20 June 2016, Mastella was elected mayor of Benevento as head of a centre-right coalition.

On 3 June 2020, he left Forza Italia to create a regional list named Noi Campani (We Campanians) in support of centre-left incumbent president Vincenzo De Luca for his re-election campaign.

References

External links
 Official website
 Mastella's blog

1947 births
Living people
People from the Province of Benevento
Christian Democracy (Italy) politicians
20th-century Italian politicians
MEPs for Italy 2009–2014
21st-century Italian politicians
Union of Democrats for Europe MEPs
Union of Democrats for Europe politicians
Christian Democratic Centre politicians
Democratic Union for the Republic politicians
Italian Ministers of Justice
Mayors of Benevento